Royal British Bank v Turquand (1856) 6 E&B 327 is a UK company law case that held people transacting with companies are entitled to assume that internal company rules are complied with, even if they are not. This "indoor management rule" or the "Rule in Turquand's Case" is applicable in most of the common law world. It originally mitigated the harshness of the constructive notice doctrine, and in the UK it is now supplemented by the Companies Act 2006 sections 39-41.

Facts
Mr Turquand was the official manager (liquidator) of the insolvent Cameron's Coalbrook Steam, Coal and Swansea and Loughor Railway Company. It was incorporated under the Joint Stock Companies Act 1844. The company had given a bond for £2,000 to the Royal British Bank, which secured the company's drawings on its current account. The bond was under the company's seal, signed by two directors and the secretary. When the company was sued, it alleged that under its registered deed of settlement (the articles of association), directors only had the power to borrow up to an amount authorised by a company resolution. A resolution had been passed but did not specify how much the directors could borrow.

Judgment
Sir John Jervis CJ, for the Court of Exchequer Chamber ruled that the bond was valid, so the Royal British Bank could enforce the terms. He said the bank was deemed to be aware that the directors could borrow only up to the amount resolutions allowed. Articles of association were registered with Companies House, so there was constructive notice. But the bank could not be deemed to know which ordinary resolutions passed, because these were not registrable. The bond was valid because there was no requirement to look into the company's internal workings. This is the indoor management rule, that the company's indoor affairs are the company's problem. Jervis CJ gave the judgment of the Court.

Pollock CB, Alderson B, Cresswell J, Crowder J and Bramwell B concurred.

Significance
The rule in Turquand's case was not accepted as being firmly entrenched in law until it was endorsed by the House of Lords. In Mahony v East Holyford Mining Co Lord Hatherly phrased the law thus:

So, in Mahoney, where the company's articles provided that cheques should be signed by any two of the three named directors and by the secretary, the fact that the directors who had signed the cheques had never been properly appointed was held to be a matter of internal management, and the third parties who received those cheques were entitled to presume that the directors had been properly appointed, and cash the cheques.

The position in English law is now superseded by section 40 of the Companies Act 2006, but the Rule in Turquand's Case is still applied throughout many common law jurisdictions in the Commonwealth. According to the Turquand rule, each outsider contracting with a company in good faith is entitled to assume that the internal requirements and procedures have been complied with. The company will consequently be bound by the contract even if the internal requirements and procedures have not been complied with. The exceptions here are: if the outsider was aware of the fact that the internal requirements and procedures have not been complied with (acted in bad faith); or if the circumstances under which the contract was concluded on behalf of the company were suspicious. 

However, it is sometimes possible for an outsider to ascertain whether an internal requirement or procedure has been complied with. If it is possible to ascertain this fact from the company's public documents, the doctrine of disclosure and the doctrine of constructive notice will apply and not the Turquand rule. The Turquand rule was formulated to keep an outsider's duty to inquire into the affairs of a company within reasonable bounds, but if the compliance or non-compliance with an internal requirement can be ascertained from the company's public documents, the doctrine of disclosure and the doctrine of constructive notice will apply. If it is an internal requirement that a certain act should be approved by a special resolution, the Turquand rule will therefore not apply in relation to that specific act, since a special resolution is registered with Companies House (in the United Kingdom), and is deemed to be public information.

See also

United Kingdom company law
Constructive notice

Notes

1856 in case law
United Kingdom company case law
Baron Bramwell cases
1856 in British law
Court of Exchequer Chamber cases